Machine Sazi Tabriz Football Club (Bashgah-e Futbal-e Mashinsazi-ye Tebriz) more commonly known as Machine Sazi was an Iranian professional football club based in Tabriz, East Azarbaijan, Iran competing in the Azadegan League.

Club history

Establishment

In 1969, Machine Sazi Tabriz Industrial Group decided to create a new football team by the name of Machine Sazi. The prototype of the team was the club Torpedo Moscow.
Machine Sazi Tabriz football club played its first official match in 1970. The club became one of the most heavily supported teams in Tabriz after a couple of years.

In 1973, the Takht Jamshid Cup was established. The Takht Jamshid Cup, was Iran's first ever nationwide football league and Machine Sazi entered the league in its first year of establishment in 1973. The club participated in Takht Jamshid Cup between 1973 and 1977.

Post Revolution

1980s

Like most sporting clubs in Iran, the Revolution and the Iran–Iraq War severely limited the team's activities. From 1979 to 1980 the club participated in almost no meaningful competitions. In 1980 the Tabriz Football League and Tabriz Hazfi Cup was established. Machine Sazi participated in the Tabriz Football League and Tabriz Hazfi Cup between 1980 and 1988. Machine Sazi was the most successful Tabriz Football League club, winning seven championship titles and finishing two times as runners-up. The club also won the Tabriz Hazfi Cup six times. After the war the local and provincial leagues were scrapped in favor of nationwide leagues.

1990s
After the war, the Azadegan League was established as Iran's national league. Machine Sazi was promoted to the Azadegan League in 1994. They stayed in the Azadegan League for two seasons and the club finished 8th the following year. But, in 1997 the club was relegated to the 2nd Division. Machine Sazi played in the 2nd Division between 1997 and 2001 until the Iran Pro League was formed.

2000s

With the launch of Iran Pro League in 2001, Machine Sazi were placed into the Azadegan League. After a 3rd-place finish in the new Azadegan League's inaugural season, Machine Sazi had a string of mid table finishes. In the 2007–08 season the club finished 11th in the Azadegan League and was relegated to 2nd Division but following the Iranian Football Federations' decision to increase the number of teams in the league to 28, Machine Sazi remained in the Azadegan League.

The club had a mixed start to the 2008–09 season in the Azadegan League. 2008 heralded major changes for Machine Sazi, as the terrible state of the club's finances was revealed; they were unable to pay wages and had massive debts. After a drop in form, recording 10 losses in 12 matches, Asghar Etebari was sacked as manager and was replaced by Sirous Bayrami. In March 2008 Javad Shahlaei resigned as chairman and Farhad Sedaghat was elected chairman by the club council. Seyed Javad Mousavi was brought in as the new club manager. Machine Sazi finished 13th in the 2008–09 Azadegan League season. Thus, being relegated to 2nd Division.

Dabiri Takeover
On 25 April 2009 the club was bought by businessman Shahram Dabiri who invested heavily in the club. After a year in the 2nd Division, Machine Sazi bought the licence of a club in the Azadegan League and was allowed to compete in the 2010–11 edition of the league. Following a 3rd-place finish in 2012 which almost brought the club back to the Iran Pro League, the club was again relegated to the 2nd Division in 2013. Machine Sazi escaped relegation to the 3rd Division the following year via a relegation play–off.

Persian Gulf Pro League
Following Machine Sazi's dismal 2013–14 season the team was taken over by the Municipality of Tabriz who introduced Gholamreza Baghabadi as the new chairman.

In June 2015 Machine Sazi replaced Shahrdari Tabriz in the 2015–16 Azadegan League as East Azerbaijan's representative. In winter of 2016 Rasoul Khatibi was named head coach of Machine Sazi and the club began the push for promotion to the Persian Gulf Pro League. On 10 May 2016 after a 3–0 win against Mes Rafsanjan, Machine Sazi confirmed their promotion to the Persian Gulf Pro League after a 19-year absence from the top flight of Iranian football.
Machine Sazi managed to draw 1–1 with Iranian and Asian giants Esteghlal at the Azadi Stadium in week 5.

Khatibi was fired midway through the season for Machine's bad performances and was replaced with Farhad Kazemi. Machine Sazi finished the season in last place and were relegated to the Azadegan League once again. In the season of 2018–19, the club replaced the Gostaresh Foulad and returned to the top flight.

Players

First Team Squad

For recent transfers, see List of Iranian football transfers winter 2022-23.

League and domestic cup history

Club stadium

Before the construction of Sahand Stadium, Machine Sazi played all of its matches at Bagh Shomal Stadium, which currently has a capacity of 25,000. They occasionally play big games at Sahand Stadium. Football academy and training ground of Machine sazi is Marzdaran Stadium.

Club colors

Kit evolution

Club managers

Managerial history
mohanmad saeid akhbari 2020

Current coaching staff

Honours
  Azadegan League
Runners-up (1): 2015–16

References

External links

 
Football clubs in Iran
Association football clubs established in 1969
Sport in Tabriz
1969 establishments in Iran